This is a list of military conflicts in which Lithuanian military forces participated.

Kingdom of Lithuania 
 Mongol invasions of Lithuania (1258–1259, 1275, 1279, and 1325)

Grand Duchy of Lithuania

Polish–Lithuanian Commonwealth

Russian Empire

Independent Lithuania

German-occupied and Soviet-occupied Lithuania

Independent modern Lithuania 
 2001, War in Afghanistan
 2003, Invasion of Iraq

See also 
 History of Europe
 List of wars
 Military of Lithuania
 List of wars involving Russia
 List of wars involving Estonia
 List of wars involving Latvia

References

Lithuania
 
Wars
Wars